Joseph Ignatius Power (January 11, 1885 – June 1, 1935) was a Canadian politician and ice hockey player, playing the left wing position for the Quebec Bulldogs from 1902 to 1911, and sitting in the Legislative Assembly of Quebec from 1927 until his death.

Early life 
Power was born in Sillery, Quebec. His father William Power was a member of Parliament in the House of Commons. One brother William Gerard Power was a member of the Legislative Council of Quebec; another, Charles Gavan Power, played professional ice hockey and became a member of Parliament and later a senator; a third brother, James also played professional ice hockey. He was the uncle of Frank Gavan Power, who also became a member of Parliament.

Career

Ice hockey 
Power joined the Quebec Hockey Club organization in 1901, playing for their "Seconds" team in the CAHL intermediate division. He joined the senior team in 1902, for whom he played until the end of the 1910–11 season. He had his best season in 1905–06, scoring 21 goals in ten games. He scored 15 goals in ten games in 1907–08.

Power was also known for his quick wit and humour in the classroom which led to the nickname his teacher gave him, "Joe the joker".

Politics 
He was elected in the 1927 Quebec general election as the Liberal member for Québec-Ouest. He was re-elected in 1931, and died in office.

References
 

1885 births
1935 deaths
Anglophone Quebec people
Ice hockey people from Quebec City
Politicians from Quebec City
Quebec Bulldogs (NHA) players
Quebec Liberal Party MNAs
People from Sainte-Foy–Sillery–Cap-Rouge
Canadian ice hockey left wingers